is a 1991 Japanese film directed by Shinsuke Shimada.

Cast
 Yasushi Ishida 
 Izumi Igarashi
 Seiki Nagahara
 Tadashi Nishikawa

Reception
It was chosen as the 7th  Best Film at the 13th Yokohama Film Festival.

References

External links
 

Films directed by Shinsuke Shimada
Japanese teen films
1990s Japanese films